Ağlasun District is a district of the Burdur Province of Turkey. Its seat is the town of Ağlasun. Its area is 305 km2, and its population is 7,652 (2021).

Composition
There is one municipality in Ağlasun District:
 Ağlasun

There are 9 villages in Ağlasun District:

 Aşağıyumrutaş 
 Çamlıdere
 Dereköy
 Hisarköy
 Kiprit
 Mamak
 Yazır
 Yeşilbaşköy
 Yumrutaş

References

Districts of Burdur Province